Ann Cathrin Lübbe (née Evenrud; born 23 January 1971) is a Norwegian Paralympic equestrian. She competed at the 2016 Summer Paralympics, winning a gold medal and silver medal. She competed at the 2020 Summer Paralympics, in Individual freestyle test grade III, winning a bronze medal.

References

External links
 
 
 

1971 births
Living people
Sportspeople from Hamar
Norwegian female equestrians
Paralympic medalists in equestrian
Paralympic gold medalists for Norway
Paralympic silver medalists for Norway
Paralympic bronze medalists for Norway
Equestrians at the 2004 Summer Paralympics
Equestrians at the 2008 Summer Paralympics
Equestrians at the 2016 Summer Paralympics
Equestrians at the 2020 Summer Paralympics
Medalists at the 2004 Summer Paralympics
Medalists at the 2008 Summer Paralympics
Medalists at the 2016 Summer Paralympics
Medalists at the 2020 Summer Paralympics
Paralympic equestrians of Norway